Shibkaveh District may refer to:

 Shibkaveh District (Fars Province)
 Shibkaveh District (Hormozgan Province)